Granada, Peru is the capital of Granada District in Peru.  It is located in the Chachapoyas Province.

References

Populated places in the Amazonas Region